Uông Bí is a city of Quảng Ninh Province in the north-eastern region of Vietnam. As of 2003 the district had a population of 98,949. The City covers an area of 240 km². Uong Bi was promoted from a town to a provincial city February 25, 2011.

Administrative divisions
The City contains 9 wards: 
 Phương Nam
 Phương Đông
 Yên Thanh
 Nam Khê
 Quang Trung 
 Trưng Vương
 Thanh Sơn
 Bắc Sơn
 Vàng Danh

and 2 communes:

 Thượng Yên Công
 Điền Công

Climate

References

Districts of Quảng Ninh province
Cities in Vietnam